The Men's keirin event of the 2015 UCI Track Cycling World Championships was held on 19 February 2015.

Results

First round
The first round was held at 16:25.

Heat 1

Heat 2

Heat 3

Heat 4

First round repechage
The first round repechage was held at 17:10.

Heat 1

Heat 2

Heat 3

Heat 4

Second round
The second round was started at 20:00.

Heat 1

Heat 2

Finals
The finals were started at 20:45.

Small final

Final

References

Men's keirin
UCI Track Cycling World Championships – Men's keirin